The Mernda Football Club is an Australian rules football club located in Mernda – a rural north-eastern town of Melbourne - that competes in the Northern Football League (formerly Diamond Valley Football League)

History
The Mernda Football Club was formed in 1891 and was known as the South Yan Yean Football Club. The club went on for 23 years before changing its name to the Mernda Football Club in 1914. In 1932 the club changed again this time to become the Plenty Rovers Football Club, where they played at the Doreen Recreation Reserve (behind the Doreen Hall), the Plenty Rovers enjoyed short stints in the DVFL in 1937-9, 1941 and in 1947. In 1965 the club returned to the Mernda Football Club name due to the club moving to the Mernda Recreation Reserve. In 1987 the club rejoined the DVFL in Division 2. In 1991 Mernda won their first DVFL premiership and claimed the Seniors and Reserves double in 2012.

Current status
In 2011, Mernda finished bottom in Division 2 and will now field Seniors, Reserves and Under 19's in Division 3 from 2012 onwards.

In 2012, Mernda won the Division 3 Seniors and Reserves premierships, thus earning them promotion back into Division 2. Spearheaded by coach Brett Wilson, captain Rohan Davies and Best on Ground Matthew Rees, Mernda defeated Panton Hill 132 - 39.

Premiership Years

Northern Football Association

1891, 1892

Bourke Evelyn Football Association

1909, 1910, 1911, 1912, 1914, 1920

Panton Hill & District Football Association / Panton Hill Football League

1936, 1947, 1949, 1950, 1951, 1964, 1971, 1981, 1981, 1982, 1983, 1986

Northern Football League / Diamond Valley Football League

1991, 2012

External links
 Mernda Football Club Website
 Northern Football League Website

Northern Football League (Australia) clubs
Australian rules football clubs established in 1891
1891 establishments in Australia
Sport in the City of Whittlesea
Australian rules football clubs in Melbourne